Gualdo Tadino (Latin: Tadinum) is an ancient town of Italy, in the province of Perugia in northeastern Umbria, on the lower flanks of Monte Penna, a mountain of the Apennines. It is  NE of Perugia.

History

Gualdo has a long history and was originally an Umbrian village known as Tarsina. Conquered by the Romans in 266 BC and re-christened Tadinum, it was a station on the Via Flaminia. In 217 BC it was destroyed by Hannibal's troops. A similar defeat was inflicted on it in 47 BC by Julius Caesar and in 410 AD by Alaric's Visigoths.

In 552, the Byzantine general Narses briefly restored Italy to the empire by defeating the Ostrogoth king Baduila in what is now known as the Battle of Taginae, the exact site of which is not known, but thought by most scholars to be a few kilometers from the town, in the plain to the west at a place called Taino. This suspicion may have received confirmation in 2004.

The ancient city survived that war, only to be destroyed in a later war at the instigation of the Holy Roman Emperor Otto III in 966. It was later rebuilt, only to be destroyed a second time by fire in 1237. Finally, the Emperor Frederick II ordered the city rebuilt for a third time in 1239, and it is this incarnation which survives today.

Gualdo Tadino sister cities are: West Pittston, PA (USA) and Audun-le-Tiche, France

Monuments and sites of interest

Religious architecture or sites 
Gualdo Tadino Cathedral: Church of St Benedict with an external fountain attributed to Antonio da Sangallo the Elder (16th century).
San Francesco: 13th-century church housing frescoes by Matteo da Gualdo.
Santa Chiara: 13th century church
San Donato: 13th-century church
Santa Maria dei Raccomandati: 13th century oratory with traces of ancient frescoesSan Facondino, Gualdo Tadino: 11th-century pilgrimage church

 Secular architecture or sites 
Rocca Flea, a 12th-century castle which is now the main monument of the town.Palazzo del Podestà.Torre Civica'' (Town Tower).
Civic Gallery, with works by Matteo da Gualdo and others.

Economy

The city was famous in the Middle Ages for the manufacture of ceramic ware; in the late 20th century, the ceramic industry was revived, and Gualdo is now an important center for the manufacture of industrial ceramics and bathroom fittings.

Transportation

Gualdo Tadino has a railway station on the line from Ancona to Rome. The journey time to Ancona is typically one hour and 45 minutes, and to Rome two hours.

Frazioni
Boschetto, Busche, Caprara, Cerqueto, Corcia, Crocicchio, Gaifana, Grello, Palazzo Mancinelli, Petroia, Piagge, Pieve di Compresseto, Poggio Sant'Ercolano, Rasina, Rigali, Roveto, San Lorenzo, San Pellegrino, Vaccara

References

External links
Official website
Bill Thayer's site
possible excavations at Taino

Hilltowns in Umbria
Roman sites of Umbria